We're Here is an American reality television series on HBO featuring former RuPaul's Drag Race contestants Bob the Drag Queen, Eureka O'Hara and Shangela. In the series, the trio of drag queens travel across the United States to recruit small-town residents to participate in one-night-only drag shows. It premiered on April 23, 2020. In June 2020, the series was renewed for a second season which premiered on October 11, 2021. In December 2021, the series was renewed for a third season which premiered on November 25, 2022.

Cast

Bob the Drag Queen
Eureka O'Hara
Shangela

Production
HBO announced the six-part reality television series on November 5, 2019, to star former RuPaul's Drag Race contestants Bob the Drag Queen, Eureka O'Hara, and Shangela. We're Here was created by Stephen Warren and Johnnie Ingram, and is executive produced by Warren, Ingram, Peter LoGreco, Eli Holzman and Aaron Saidman. LoGreco also directs. Caldwell Tidicue (Bob the Drag Queen), Eureka D. Huggard (Eureka O'Hara) and D.J. Pierce (Shangela Laquifa Wadley) serve as consulting producers.

HBO EVP of Programming Nina Rosenstein said, "Drag is about confidence and self expression. We are so thrilled to showcase the transformative power of the art form with our audience."

The final episode of the first season, which was slated to be set in Spartanburg, South Carolina, was halted by the imposition of lockdowns due to the COVID-19 pandemic in the United States. The episode instead became a Zoom-based discussion among the three hosts about their own personal journeys through drag;

On June 5, 2020, HBO renewed the series for a second season which premiered on October 11, 2021. The second season launched with a return to Spartanburg.

On December 16, 2021, HBO renewed the series for a third season which premiered on November 25, 2022.

Broadcast
On February 19, 2020, it was announced that We're Here would premiere on April 23, 2020.

Episodes

Season 1 (2020)

Season 2 (2021)

Season 3 (2022)

Reception

Awards and nominations

References

External links

2020 American television series debuts
2020s American LGBT-related television series
2020s American reality television series
2020s LGBT-related reality television series
American LGBT-related reality television series
Drag (clothing) television shows
English-language television shows
HBO original programming
Television series by Home Box Office